James Hendrix may refer to:

 Jimi Hendrix (1942–1970), American rock guitarist, singer, and songwriter
 James R. Hendrix (1925–2002), United States Army master sergeant and Medal of Honor recipient
 James Wesley Hendrix (born 1977), United States District Judge